Victor Edmondson Krafft (June 3, 1919 – November 21, 1991) was an American professional basketball player. He played for the Dayton Rens in the National Basketball League for three games during the 1948–49 season and averaged 2.0 points per game.

References

1919 births
1991 deaths
African-American basketball players
United States Army personnel of World War II
American men's basketball players
Basketball players from Chicago
Dayton Rens players
Guards (basketball)
Harlem Globetrotters players
Junior college men's basketball players in the United States
20th-century African-American sportspeople